Curoca or Kuroka is a municipality in Cunene Province in Angola. The municipality had a population of 41,087 in 2014. It used to be called Vila de Aviz.

Its main town is named Onkokwa.

References

Populated places in Cunene Province
Municipalities of Angola